Mark Looms (born 24 March 1981) is a Dutch former professional footballer who played as a left back. 

Looms made his debut in professional football in the 2000–01 season, when he played for Heracles Almelo. After having played twelve years for Heracles, Looms wanted to have a new challenge and signed with NAC Breda in the summer of 2012. Because of a severe hip injury, Looms had to end his professional career in November 2013, having made only eight appearances for NAC.

Honours
Heracles Almelo
 Eerste Divisie: 2004–05

References

1981 births
Living people
Dutch footballers
Eredivisie players
Heracles Almelo players
NAC Breda players
Sportspeople from Almelo
Association football defenders
Footballers from Overijssel